Standoff distance is a security term that refers to measures to prevent unscreened and potentially threatening people and vehicles from approaching within a certain distance of a building, car, or other shelter, roadblock or other location, or to a person such as a law enforcement officer or VIP, or to a friendly area / location.

Standoff distance is used when a violent criminal is in a fortified position, when hostages are under armed threat from kidnappers, when a bomb is believed to have been placed, or when other unspecified dangers may be lurking. It is a measure of distance used by government, law enforcement, or military operatives handling the situation to protect their own agents and civilians from physical injury or death while the situation is resolved.

Standoff distance may be ensured using fixed physical barriers such as fences or bollards; temporary placement of items to block access (e.g., using law enforcement vehicles or police tape to block a road or bridge); physical features other than barriers (these may appear innocuous, such as the White House lawn or adding an ornamental pond); armed guards or positions (e.g., a police sniper in overwatch); or deploying police officers with carbines such as an M-4, instead of just a service sidearm. When police officers have carbines the standoff distance is increased because an attacker who poses a threat can be fired upon from greater distances.

Firearms

When an armed and violent criminal is sheltered in a location not easily reachable by a tranquilizer round or disabling shot - or lethal ammunition, if authorized by mission leaders - police, military, and counterterrorism officers maintain distance (often out of the direct line of sight and behind cover) while often using a megaphone to call for backup, the arrest of the subject, or to take him/her into custody. 

Sniper coverage is used often in these situations, and standard procedure for officers or operatives (or citizens taking part in a citizen's arrest) is to call for heavily armored backup while maintaining cover themselves.  In the wake of active shooter scenarios, some law enforcement agencies have switched to moving in on the suspects, to prevent the gunmen from harming civilians. Therapeutic interventions or diplomatic techniques may be used to talk down the suspects or identified threats and assailants.

Hostage situations

In a hostage situation, the primary goal is the safe recovery of the hostages, who are usually held under threat of violence or other prolonged physical harm (starvation, poisoning, bleeding, illness) from kidnappers. Thus the situation is treated similarly to situations with other armed attackers under cover, but with even more caution. Snipers are often employed to attempt to provide leverage against the hostage-takers or to fire at the hostage takers if an imminent risk of harm to the hostages is identified. 

Unless all kidnappers can be hit and killed by sniper gunfire almost simultaneously, generally extreme prejudice (e.g., shooting at gunmen) is not used as freely due to the danger of other kidnappers killing the hostages, as in the 1972 Munich example. 

This is not true in lone wolf situations, where the hostage taker is often shot by a snipers with armor-piercing or wall-piercing ammunition if talk or negotiation resolution is impossible.  In all situations the preferred method is to talk the kidnappers into releasing the hostages for ransom or otherwise talking them down using therapeutic or diplomatic techniques, to protect the safety of the hostages and, ideally, have the suspect surrender peacefully.

Bombs
With bomb threats, the standoff distance used by law enforcement officers depends on the size and type of the bomb. 
The smallest standoff distances, about 70 feet (21 m) from the threat, are used for small pipe bombs with about five pounds (2.25 kg) of explosives.  A human suicide bomber with about 20 pounds (9 kg) of explosives strapped to his/her body has a standoff distance of 110 feet (33.5 m). A briefcase or suitcase bomb with about 50 pounds (22.67 kg) of explosives has a 150 foot (46 m) standoff distance. Larger car bombs or truck bombs have a much larger standoff distance, as the blast radius is bigger.  A car bomb with a 500 pound (226.79 kg) bomb has a 320 foot (97.5 m) standoff distance. A small delivery truck-based truck bomb with a 1,000 pound (453.59 kg) bomb has a 640 foot (195 m) standoff distance. A huge 18-wheeler truck-sized truck bomb with over 60,000 pounds (27215.5 kg) of explosives has a 1,570 foot (478.5 m) standoff distance.

Standoff distance is also intended to deter terrorists from using car bombs by making it more difficult for them to cause catastrophic damage. In the wake of the Oklahoma City bombing, many high-risk federal buildings began enforcing standoff distances. It is based on the concept that a blast shock load is essentially a high-pressure front that moves out radially and decays very quickly - because blast falloff is thus often more exponential than linear (indeed radial - any given explosive must cover a circular-shaped area but blast power generally only increases linearly with explosive strength), any standoff distance helps increases survival chances for passersby and minimizes danger, though shrapnel mitigates this effect if present.  

Hydraulic roadblocks (sometimes wedge-shaped), or bollards can be raised to block approaching vehicles; these can be designed to prevent even a heavy, fast-moving truck from getting through. Jersey barriers and concrete planters filled with dirt have also been used to maintain separation between screened and unscreened traffic. Certain infrastructure at risk of terrorist attack, such as bridges, may not be well-suited to standoff distances since their purpose is for traffic to travel along them.

Notes

References

External links
 http://www.asisonline.org/councils/BlastResistantStandards_1.pdf

Counterterrorism
Law enforcement
Security
Architecture